Warren Hollow is a valley in Iron County in the U.S. state of Missouri.

Warren Hollow has the name of a pioneer citizen.

References

Valleys of Iron County, Missouri
Valleys of Missouri